White Springs Television (WSTV) was an American internet television channel which featured mainly motion pictures. It was owned by White Springs Media, and had its studios in Portland, Oregon, and technical facilities in White Springs, Florida. The network was a namesake of the town. It was established in August 2005 by Victor Ives, a veteran Portland broadcaster who helped relaunch KEBN channel 32 (now KRCW-TV) in 1994 with an all-movie schedule. This helped inspire Ives to create a movie channel featuring all movies around the clock—mostly with films from the public domain and made-for-TV movies, with TV commercials and short features seen only between films.

White Springs Television was available nationwide on selected cable television systems and television stations. It was available via FTA on Galaxy 27, however, the channel went dark on that satellite in October 2009. The network's parent company, White Springs Media also owns the TalkStar Radio Network and used the WSTV transponder to distribute TalkStar programming.  White Springs also owns satellite teleport facilities.

White Springs Television was seen on outlets including WANN-LD 32.4 in Atlanta (formerly on WYGA-LD 16.2); WWCG-LP in Columbus, Georgia; KFLA-LD Los Angeles; KDEO-LD Denver; KHPK-LP Denton, Texas; and KITL-LP Boise. Company publicity claimed over a hundred full- and part-time network affiliates, but did not publish a list.

In October 2009, White Springs TV announced on its website that it would be changing its name to The Golden Age of Movies Channel.  The website also stated there would be new satellite coordinates and web streaming. (No such network was launched.) The website remained active, until September 2014. The streaming link continued to operate as "WSTV", while a schedule page on White Springs TV's site went to a domain parker. After September 2014, the website and the streaming link were taken down.

External links
 White Springs Television (Internet Archive - 2009)
 White Springs Television (Internet Archive - 2013)
 Golden Age of Movies (Internet Archive)
 Lyngsat - Galaxy 27 satellite page (Internet Archive)
 PRWeb press release: "New Kind of TV Station Shows Movies Commercial Free..."

Television networks in the United States
Movie channels
Companies based in Florida
Mass media in Oregon
Companies based in Portland, Oregon
Television channels and stations established in 2007
Television channels and stations disestablished in 2009
Defunct television networks in the United States
Internet television channels
2005 establishments in Oregon